Gde ćemo večeras (English: Where Are We Going Tonight) is the ninth studio album by Bosnian Serb singer Indira Radić, released in 2001.

Track listing
Ko je ona žena
Prevaranti
Moju ljubav izdao si
Vidi šta si sad bez mene
Ne boli to
Zivot ide dalje
Ne pitaj
Gde ćemo večeras
Idi ljubavi
Ima nešto

References

2001 albums
Indira Radić albums
Grand Production albums